Linus Butt (born 12 March 1987) is a former German field hockey player. He represented his country at the 2016 Summer Olympics, where he won the bronze medal.

References

External links
 
 
 
 

1987 births
Living people
German male field hockey players
Field hockey players at the 2016 Summer Olympics
Olympic field hockey players of Germany
Olympic bronze medalists for Germany
Olympic medalists in field hockey
Medalists at the 2016 Summer Olympics
Place of birth missing (living people)
2010 Men's Hockey World Cup players
2014 Men's Hockey World Cup players
21st-century German people